= Ivan Vukadinović (writer) =

Serbian writer

Ivan Vukadinović (Belgrade, 1974) is a Serbian writer and essayist. He writes epic and science fiction novels, essays on geopolitics, science and literature, as well as travelogues on mountaineering.

== Biography ==
Vukadinović graduated from the 6th Belgrade Gymnasium and the Faculty of Organizational Sciences in Belgrade.

He made his debut as a novelist in 2006 with the fantasy trilogy "Three Goblins", which is a continuation of J. R. R. Tolkien's realm.

== Bibliography ==
- Eternal Fire ("Three Goblins" 1: a thousand years after The Lord of the Rings), independent author's edition, Belgrade, 2006 and. 2007. ISBN 978-86-908903-0-9 .. i. ISBN 978-86-908903-1-6;
- Scepter ("Three Goblins" 2), independent author's edition. Belgrade: 2007. ISBN 978-86-908903-2-3;
- Dawn of the New Day ("Three Goblins" 3), independent author's edition. Belgrade: 2007. ISBN 978-86-908903-3-0;
- Agartha: the kingdom of the underworld and the earth, "Liber". Belgrade: 2010. ISBN 978-86-6133-012-4;
- Heretics Agarte, "Draslar partner". Belgrade: 2012. ISBN 978-86-7614-202-6;
- Artifact, Scriptorium. Belgrade: 2012. ISBN 978-86-6313-002-9;
- World of Agartha, "Pesic and Sons". Belgrade: 2014. ISBN 978-86-7540-192-6.

== Reception ==
In reviewing the Heretics Agartha the writer Danko Stojić says that "Vukadinović is a writer who has excellent knowledge from many scientific and parascientific fields (...) A book of knowledge feeds his imagination and drives him to various speculations (...) Heretic Agartha can be a kind of breviary for lovers of mysticism and occultism. ”

Regarding ArtefactStojić writes that Vukadinović's novels "are on the border of science fiction and historical fiction, playfully and boldly play[ed] with the phenomena of time and space, while his imagination is boundless."
